Grégory Gendrey (born 10 July 1986) is a Guadeloupean footballer who plays as a midfielder for French club Épinal. He is also a Guadeloupean international.

Career
Gendrey plays as an attacking midfielder and a left winger and began his career with Evolucas on the island of Guadeloupe. In 2009, Gendrey signed an amateur contract with professional club Vannes OC, however left the club in January 2010 to join Compiègne. After spending a year with Compiègne, in which he amassed over 30 appearances, Gendrey left the club to play for Charleroi-Marchienne in Belgium.

In January 2019, after six months with Schiltigheim, he returned to US Créteil where he signed a six-month contract. In July 2019 he moved to Stade Lavallois, signing a one-year deal with the option for an extension if the club won promotion.

At the end of his Laval contract, Gendret signed for SAS Épinal in Championnat National 2.

International goals
Scores and results list Guadeloupe's goal tally first.

References

External links
 Profile at ZeroZeroFootball
 

1986 births
Living people
People from Basse-Terre
Association football midfielders
French footballers
Guadeloupean footballers
French people of Guadeloupean descent
Guadeloupe international footballers
2009 CONCACAF Gold Cup players
2011 CONCACAF Gold Cup players
FC Etar 1924 Veliko Tarnovo players
Vannes OC players
AFC Compiègne players
R. Olympic Charleroi Châtelet Farciennes players
Paris FC players
Jura Sud Foot players
ÉFC Fréjus Saint-Raphaël players
FC Chambly Oise players
US Créteil-Lusitanos players
SC Schiltigheim players
Stade Lavallois players
SAS Épinal players
First Professional Football League (Bulgaria) players
Championnat National players
Championnat National 2 players
Expatriate footballers in Bulgaria